Ernest King Bramblett (April 25, 1901 – December 27, 1966) was an American Republican politician who represented California's Central Coast in the U.S. House of Representatives from 1947 to 1955 when he was convicted. He was elected to the U.S. House in the 1946 Republican landslide when he ousted Democratic incumbent Rep. George Outland.

Biography
Born in Fresno, California, Bramblett graduated from Stanford University in 1925 with a bachelor of arts degree in education, and later attended several other colleges for post-graduate work.  He worked in insurance sales and car sales before becoming a high school teacher, principal and administrator.  From 1943 to 1946 he was responsible for coordinating the curriculum between high schools and elementary schools of the Monterey County school system.

A Republican, Bramblett was Mayor of Pacific Grove from 1939 to 1947, and a member of California's Republican Central Committee from 1944 to 1946.

In 1946, Bramblett was elected to the 80th United States Congress.  He was reelected three times, and served from January 3, 1947 to January 3, 1955.  He was not a candidate for renomination in 1954.

Convicted
In February 1954, Bramblett was convicted of several charges related to payroll fraud with his Congressional staff; he paid salaries to four individuals who did no work for him.  They returned the money to Bramblett so he could convert it to his personal use.  He was sentenced to four months to a year in prison, which was suspended.  He was also fined $5,000, and was placed on probation for a year.  The federal government later sued to recoup the money he had acquired from his fraud, and obtained a judgment against him.

After his conviction, Bramblett became a government affairs consultant in southern California, and was a resident of Woodland Hills.  He died in Woodland Hills on December 27, 1966, and was buried at Oakwood Memorial Park Cemetery in Chatsworth.

See also
 List of American federal politicians convicted of crimes
 List of federal political scandals in the United States
 U.S. Congressional Delegations from California

References

External links

Ernest K. Bramblett at Political Graveyard

|-

1901 births
1966 deaths
20th-century American politicians
California politicians convicted of crimes
Mayors of places in California
People from Fresno, California
People from Pacific Grove, California
Republican Party members of the United States House of Representatives from California
Stanford University alumni